= V. O. Hammon Publishing Company =

Souvenir of Chicago in Colors published by the V. O. Hammon Publishing Company, a collection of postcards of Chicago by the company

The V. O. Hammon Publishing Company was a Chicago-based manufacturer of postcards from the Great Lakes region in the early 20th century. As of 1915, the company would buy only postcard rights to negatives from photographers.

== Gallery ==
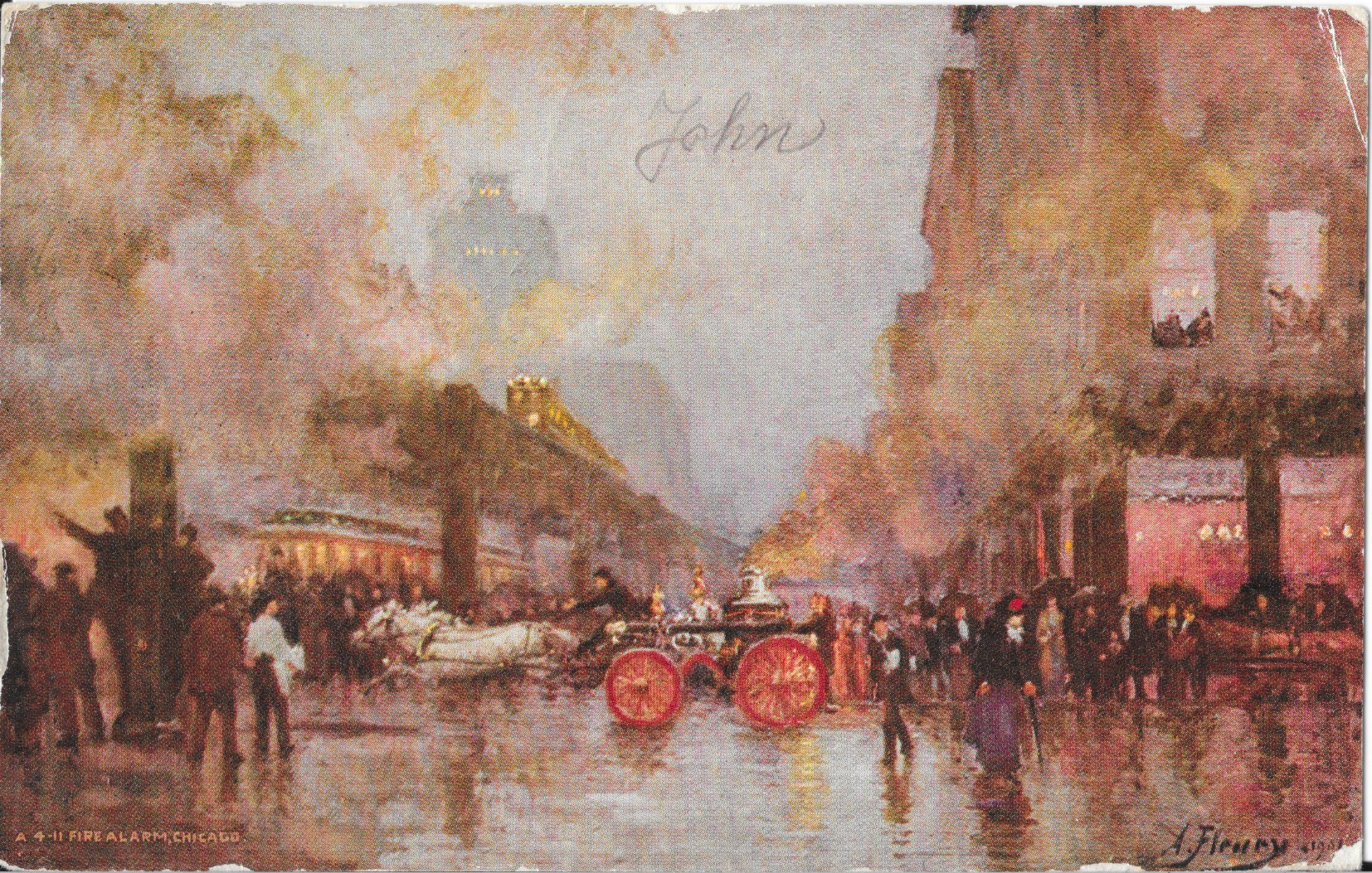
Chicago 1914 Fire Engine

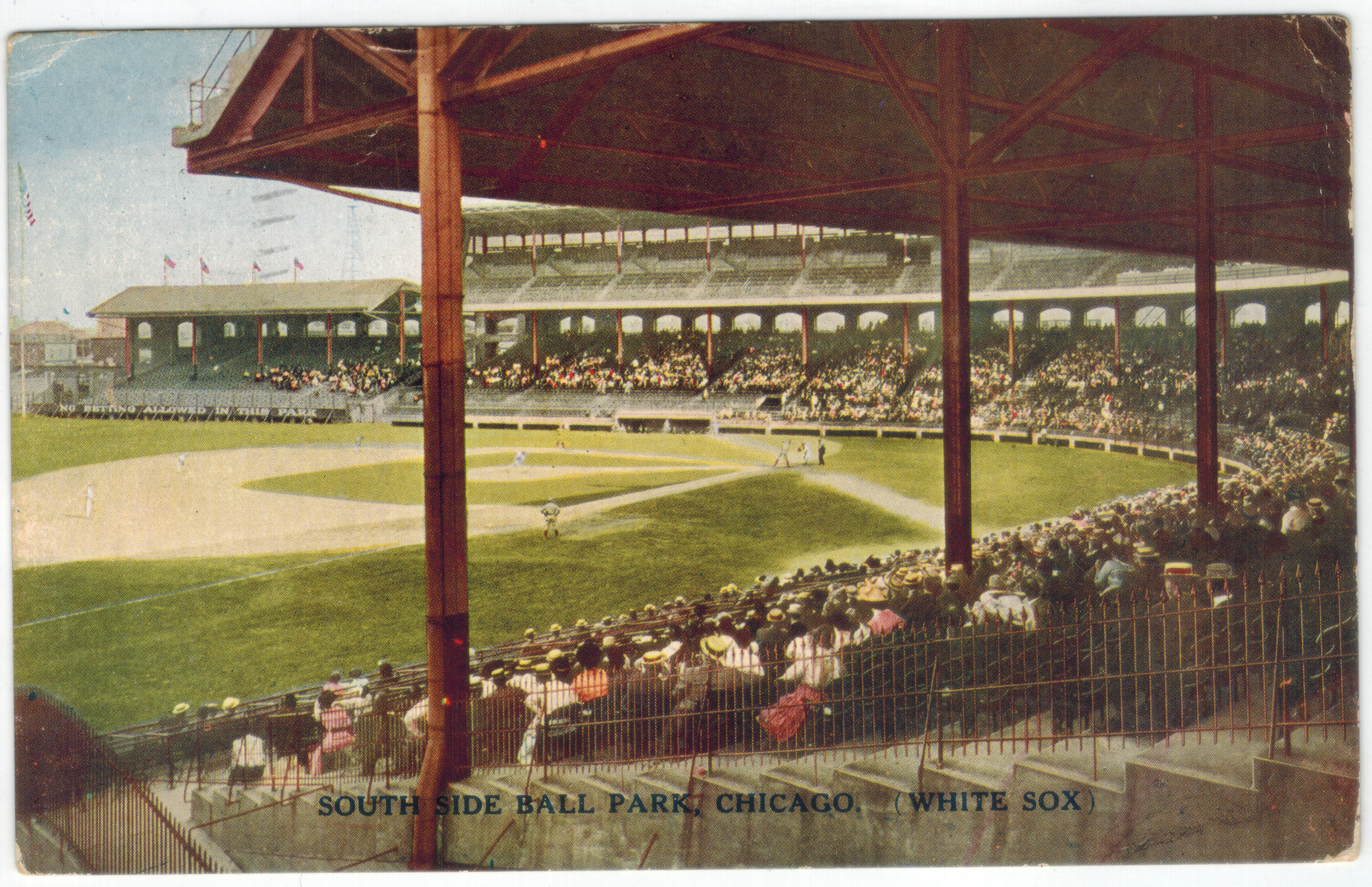
South Side Ball Park, Chicago, White Sox

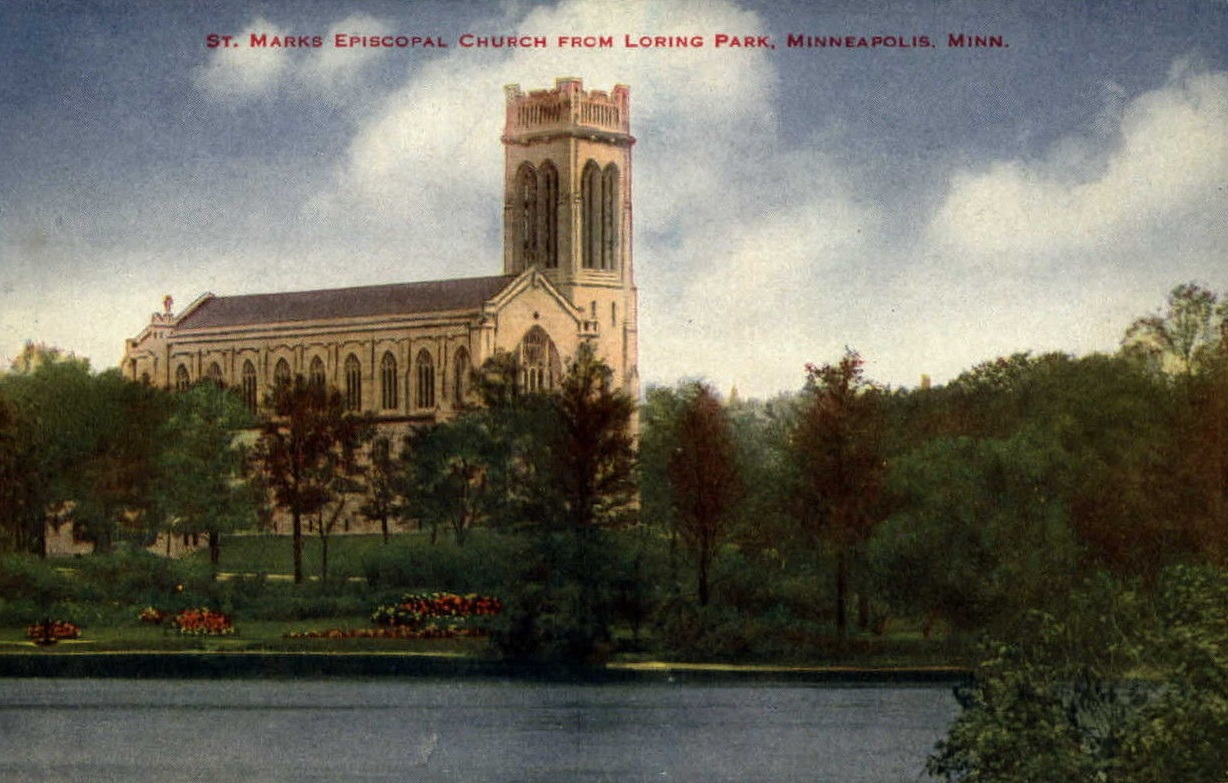
Postcard published 1907 by V.O. Hammon Publishing Company, Chicago, showing St. Mark's Episcopal Church (which later became a cathedral) seen from Loring Park in Minneapolis, Minnesota, United States

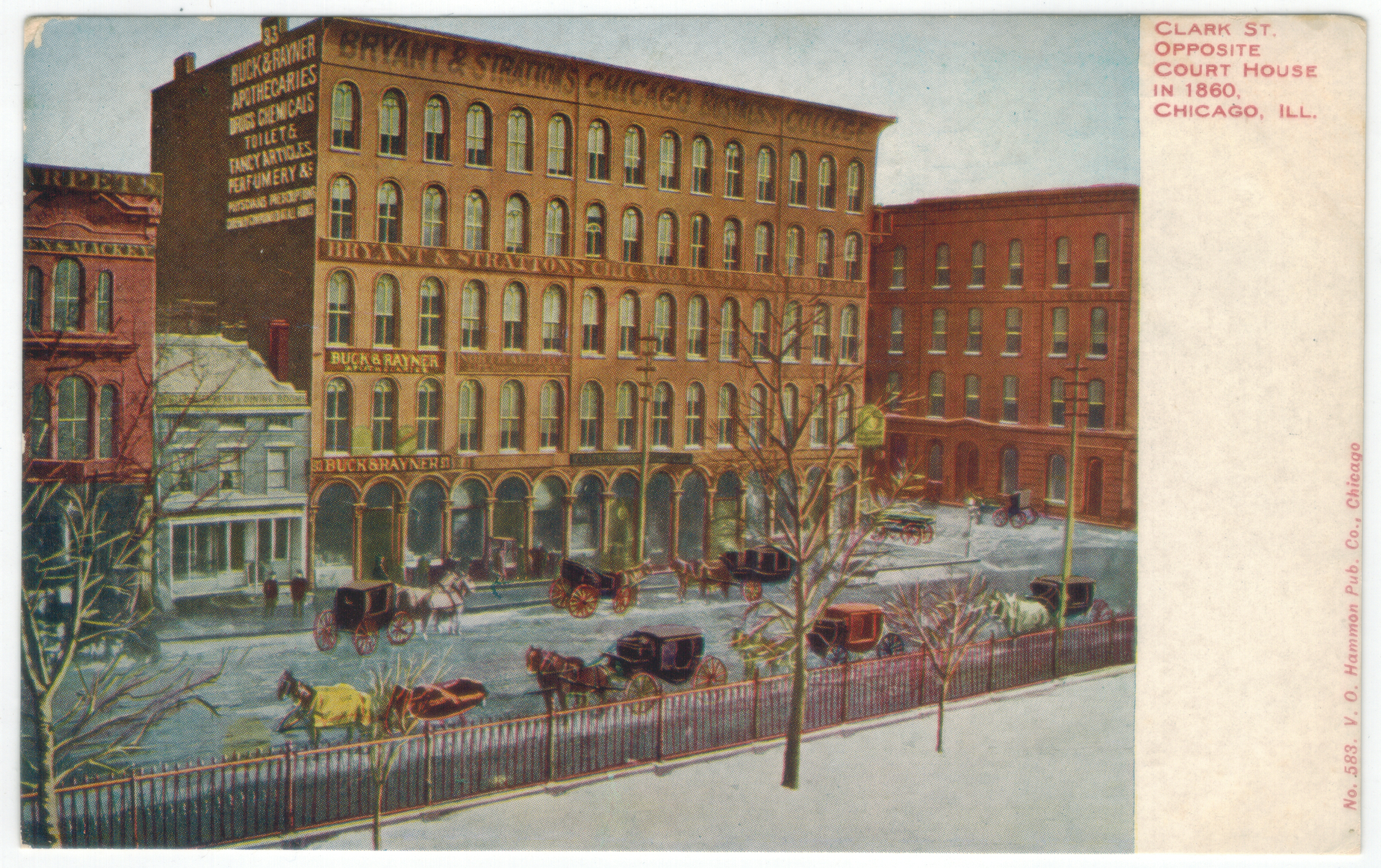
Clark Street Opposite Court House in 1860, Chicago, Ill.

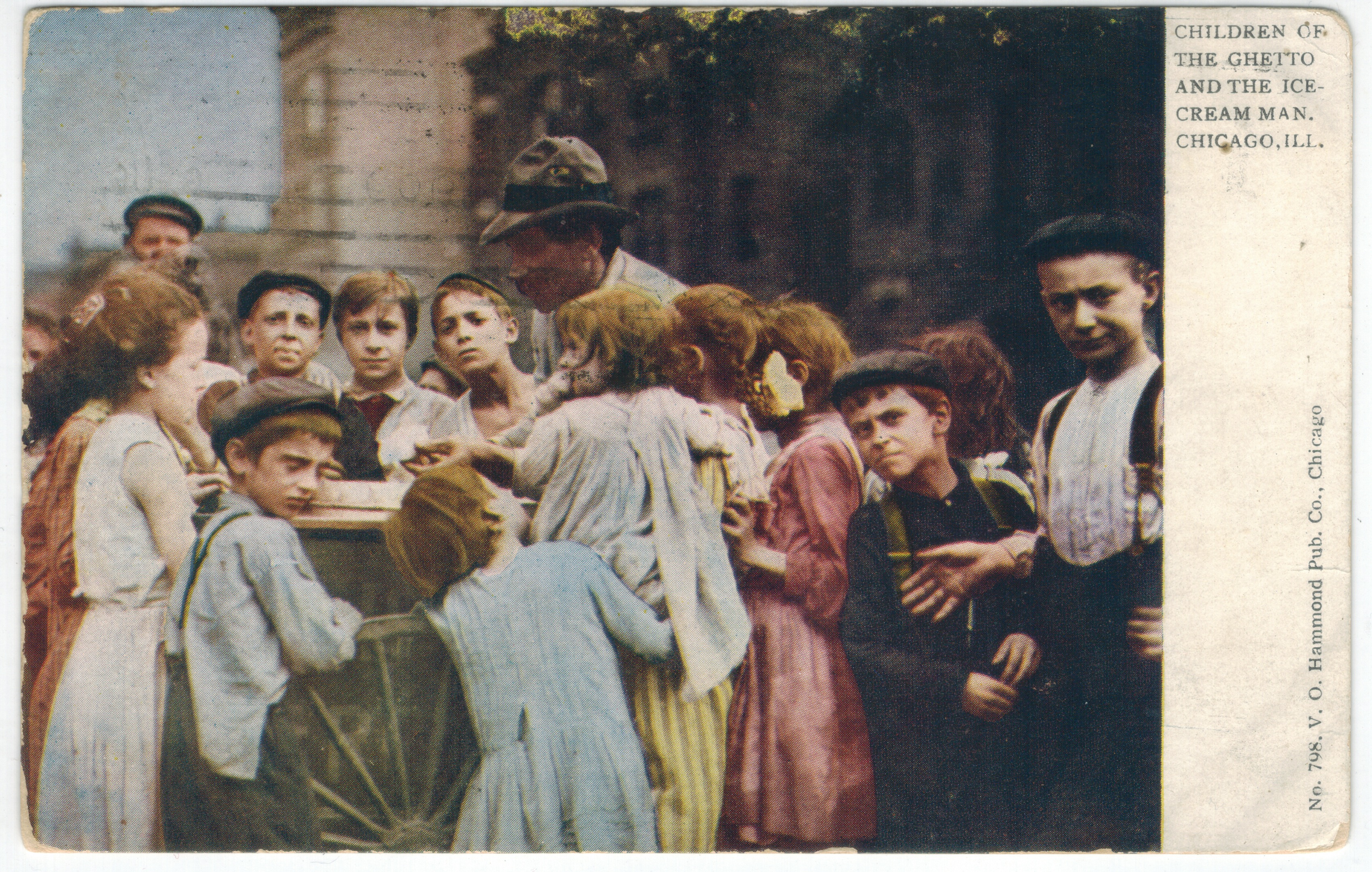
Children in the Ghetto and the Ice-Cream Man. Chicago Ill.

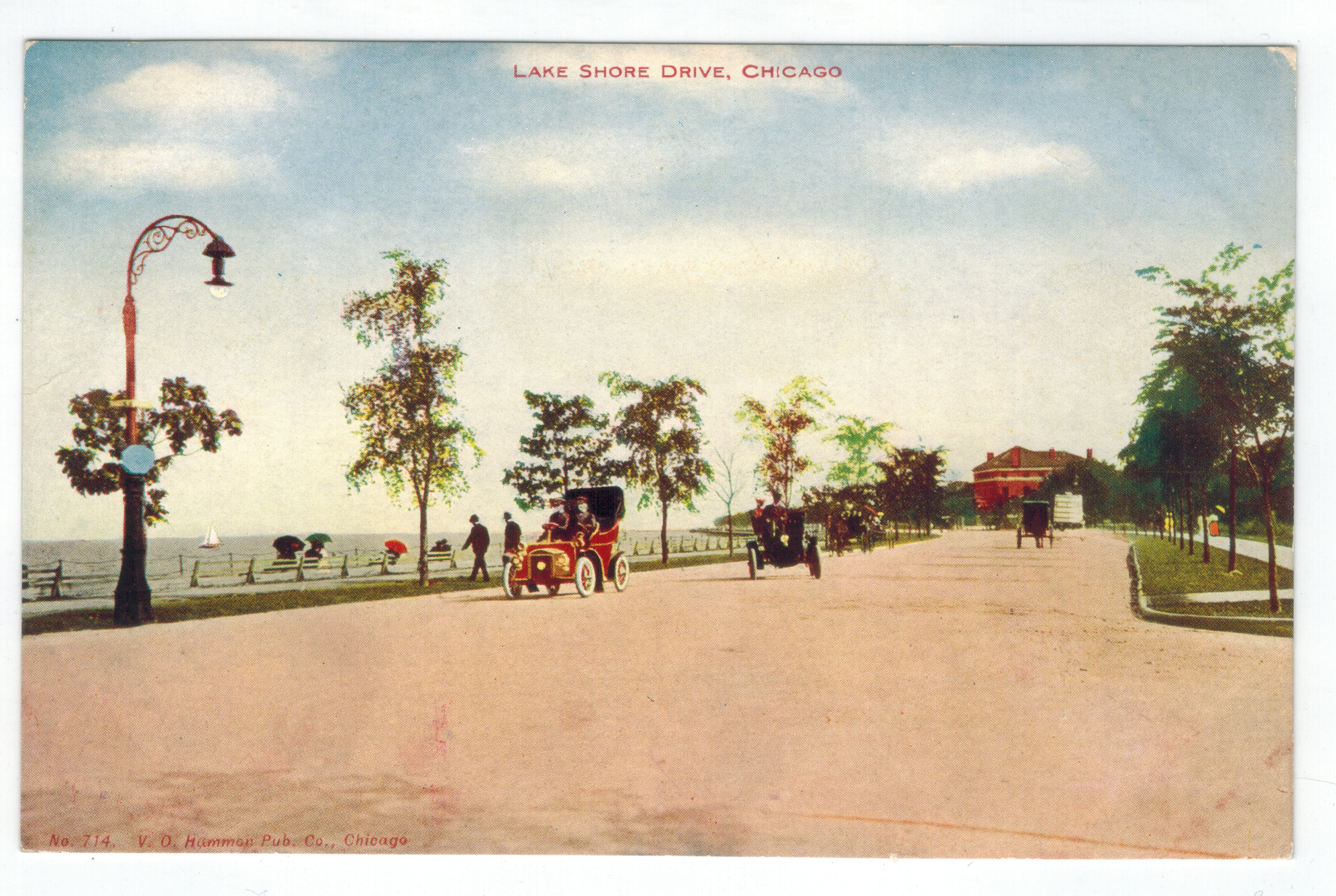
Lake Shore Drive, Chicago

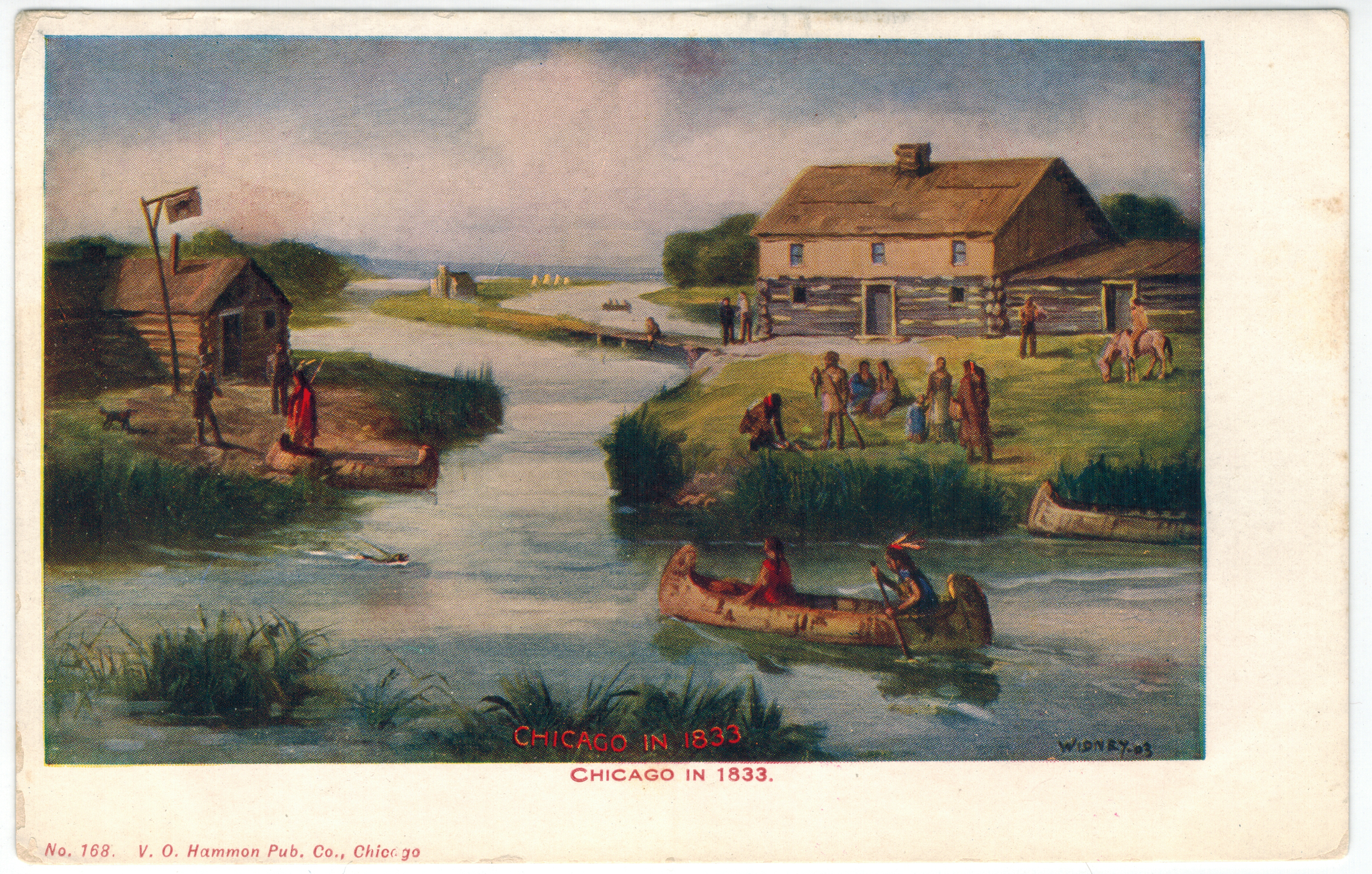
Chicago in 1833
